Kampung Alor (Jawi: كامڤوڠ الور; Portuguese: Aldeia de Alor) is a village located in East Timor. This village belongs to the administrative post Dom Aleixo, Dili. In 2015, the total population was around 3,531. And has an area of 0.49 km².

Kampung Alor consists of several areas; Anin Fuic (Atarac Laran/Ai-Tarak Laran/Aitarak Laran), Hamahon, and Rai Lacan.

History
Kampung Alor is part of the history of the development of Islam in East Timor. In 1512, Abdullah Afif, an Arab merchant arrived and settled in Dili; then followed by Habib Umar Muhdlar in 1678. In the early 19th century, Dutch East Indies (now Indonesia) Muslims traders lived and settled in Dili. They come from Kupang, Solor, Adonara, Alor, Bima, Maluku Islands, Makassar, and Buton.

Muslims from Indonesia live in groups and side by side in the Arab village of Lecidere Village (now Dr. Antonio de Carvalho Road). Indonesian Muslims, most of whom come from Alor Island, some live in Kampung Karaketu Farul. The expansion of Dili City in 1955 relocated the residents of Karaketu Farul Village to Aldeia de Alor, Bairo Morros, or Morro Alor which means Kampung Alor. In the same year, H. Hasan ibn Abdullah Balafif, Chief of Morro Allor planned the establishment of the An-Nur Mosque.

Demographics
The population of Kampung Alor is mostly indigenous of East Timor with a significant number of immigrants from Indonesian and Arabic descent. Islam is the religion of most of the inhabitants of Kampung Alor, then Catholic which is embraced by the indigenous people of East Timor.

The majority of the residents of Kampung Alor are multilingual or able to speak two or more languages. The language spoken by the people is Tetun which is the national language of East Timor, Portuguese, Dili Malay, and Indonesian. Indonesian language is even used in the Friday prayer sermon at the An-Nur Mosque.

Notable peoples
Anwar da Costa, Grand Imam of An-Nur Mosque
Krisdayanti, member of DPR-RI
Mari Alkatiri, East Timorese politician
Raul Lemos, East Timorese businessman

References

Islam in East Timor
Dili